The International Spinal Cord Society (ISCoS) was founded in 1961 as the International Medical Society of Paraplegia. It is an INGO, whose purpose is to study all problems relating to lesions of the spinal cord.

History 
The International Medical Society of Paraplegia was founded in 1961. The first President was Sir Ludwig Guttmann.In September 2001, at the General Meeting in Nottwil, Switzerland, it was agreed another name of the Society: The International Spinal Cord Society (ISCoS).

Objectives 
 to study all problems relating to lesions of the spinal cord
 enables scientific exchange between the members
 Advice, support, promote, coordinate research, development and evaluation activities in context with spinal cord injuries worldwide
 Counseling, support in the care of patients involved
 Counseling, support of those responsible for education and training of medical professionals

Presidents

Members 
 Full members 
 Associate members
 Senior members 
 Emeritus members 
 Fellowship of ISCoS 
 Affiliated members

Affiliated members 
 American Paraplegia Society (APS) 
 American Spinal Injury Association (ASIA) 
 Asian Spinal Cord Network (ASCoN)
 Association Francophone Internationale des Groupes d'Animation de la Paraplégie (AFIGAP) 
 Australian and New Zealand Spinal Cord Society (ANZSCoS)
 Chinese Association of Rehabilitation of Disabled Persons – Society of Spinal Cord Injury (CARDP – SoSCI)
 Deutschsprachige Medizinische Gesellschaft für Paraplegie (DMGP) 
 Dutch Flemish Spinal Cord Society (DUFSCoS)
 Japan Medical Society of Spinal Cord Lesions(JASCoL) 
 Latin American Society of Paraplegia (SLAP) 
 Nordic Spinal Cord Society(NoSCoS)
 Romanian Spinal Cord Society (RoSCoS) 
 Societá Medica Italiana di Paraplegia (SoMIPAR)
 Southern African Spinal Cord Association (SASCA) 
 Spanish Society of Paraplegia (SEP) 
 Spinal Cord Society – Indian Chapter
 Turkish Society of Spinal Cord Diseases (TrSCD)

Journal 
SPINAL CORD is the monthly publication of the International Spinal Cord Society.
The Editorial Office is at the Stoke Mandeville Hospital  in UK. The Editor-in-Chief is Professor Lisa Harvey, University of Sydney, Australia.

References

External links 
 Official website

Allied health professions-related professional associations
Aylesbury
Health care-related professional associations
International medical and health organizations
Organisations based in Buckinghamshire
Spinal cord
International organisations based in the United Kingdom